Mirošov may refer to:

Czech Republic
 Mirošov (Jihlava District)
 Mirošov (Rokycany District)
 Mirošov (Žďár nad Sázavou District)

Slovakia
 Nižný Mirošov
 Vyšný Mirošov